The pretracheal fascia is a layer of the deep cervical fascia at the front of the neck. It attaches to the hyoid bone above, and - extending down into the thorax - blends with the fibrous pericardium below. It encloses the thyroid gland and parathyroid glands, trachea, and esophagus. It extends medially in front of the carotid vessels. It assists in forming the carotid sheath.

The back portion of the pretracheal fascia is known as the buccopharyngeal fascia.

Structure 
The pretracheal fascia is continued behind the depressor muscles of the hyoid bone. After enveloping the thyroid gland, it is prolonged in front of the trachea to meet the corresponding layer of the opposite side. The pretracheal layer of the deep cervical fascia passes in front of the carotid sheath (i.e., common carotid artery, internal jugular vein, and vagus nerve) and in front of the cervical viscera (larynx, oesophagus, and pharynx). The muscular layer ensheathes the infrahyoid muscles.

Above, the pretracheal fascia is fixed to the hyoid bone. Below, it is carried downward in front of the trachea and large vessels at the root of the neck, and ultimately blends with the fibrous pericardium.

The pretracheal fascia is fused on either side with the prevertebral fascia, and with it completes the compartment containing the larynx and trachea, the thyroid gland, and the pharynx and esophagus.

Function 
The pretracheal fascia encloses the thyroid gland, and is responsible for its movement during deglutition.

See also
 Fascia

References

External links
 Sagittal Section Showing Deep Cervical Fascial Layers
 Infrahyoid Cross-Section Showing Layers of Deep Cervical Fascia
 

Fascial spaces of the head and neck